Stronger Than the Truth is the thirty-second  studio album by American country music singer Reba McEntire. It was released on April 5, 2019, by Big Machine Records. The album was nominated for Best Country Album at the 62nd Grammy Awards.

Background
On September 18, 2018, McEntire posted a picture on Instagram stating that she was back in the studio, and told The Boot that; "It's gonna be probably the most country album I've ever recorded." She also described it as "real country", and was inspired by the music she grew up listening to." In a press release, McEntire explained her inspiration and song selection, saying, "The response to Sing It Now: Songs of Faith & Hope reinforced my love for recording songs that speak to the heart. So when I started selecting songs for this album, I stuck with that same formula – go with the songs that touch my heart, and hopefully when you hear me singing it, they'll touch yours too. That honesty once again revealed itself."

The track "Cactus in a Coffee Can" was originally recorded by Jerry Kilgore on his 1999 album Love Trip.

Promotion and release
The album was announced on February 11, 2019. The first promotional single from the album, "Stronger Than the Truth", was released on February 15, along with the album's pre-order. McEntire also announced that a new song from the album would be released each Friday leading up the album's April 5 release date. "No U in Oklahoma" was released as the second promotional single on February 22. On March 1, "In His Mind" was released as the third promotional single. "Tammy Wynette Kind of Pain" was released on March 8 as the fourth promotional single. The fifth promotional single, "Storm in a Shot Glass" was released on March 15. "Freedom" was released as the album's lead single on March 22.

On March 28, the album became available for streaming exclusively on NPR Music's website as a part of their First Listen series.

McEntire also performed the album's single "Freedom" on the 54th Academy of Country Music Awards on April 8, 2019

Commercial performance
Stronger Than the Truth debuted at No. 4 on Billboard Top Country Albums, with 20,000 traditional albums sold (21,000 in equivalent album units). It is her 27th top 10 in the Top Country Albums chart, the first of which she achieved 33 years ago on April 19, 1986 with Whoever's in New England. The album has sold 57,500 copies in the United States as of March 2020.

Critical reception
Rating it 4 out of 5 stars, Stephen Thomas Erlewine of AllMusic called it a "pure, unadorned country album" and "flinty even when it's tender". He also wrote that "She channels this empathetic toughness into a series of songs that plays like short stories...and that deft, subtle blend of music and message gives Stronger Than the Truth a lasting emotional resonance."

Track listing

Personnel
Adapted from the album liner notes.

Vocals
Wyatt Beard – background vocals 
Buddy Cannon – background vocals 
Melonie Cannon – background vocals 
Sonya Isaacs – background vocals 
Reba McEntire – lead vocals
Jenifer Wrinkle – background vocals 

Production and musicians

Jim "Moose" Brown – piano , B-3 organ , synthesizer 
Buddy Cannon – producer
Alex Carter – recording assistant 
Tony Castle – recording, mixing 
Taylor Chadwick – mastering assistant
Tony Creasman – drums, tambourine 
Nick Davison – recording assistant 
Shannon Finnegan – production coordination
Bobbi Geil – mastering assistant
Mike Johnson – steel guitar, dobro 
Jeff King – electric guitar 
Catherine Marx – piano 
Brent Mason – acoustic guitar , electric guitar 
Reba McEntire – producer
Andrew Mendelson – mastering
Jason Mott – recording assistant 
Larry Paxton – bass
Megan Peterson – mastering assistant
Deanie Richardson – fiddle, viola 
Bryce Roberts – recording assistant 
Ned Singh – recording assistant
Joe Spivey – fiddle 
Bobby Terry – acoustic guitar , banjo 

Other
Brett Freedman – hair, make-up
Loretta Harper – wardrobe
Allison Jones – A&R
Robby Klein – photography
Leslie Matthews – wardrobe
Justin McIntosh – art direction, graphic design, wardrobe
Janice Soled – copy coordinator
Brianna Steinitz – copy coordinator

Charts

Weekly charts

Year-end charts

References

2019 albums
Albums produced by Buddy Cannon
Big Machine Records albums
Reba McEntire albums